A passenger is a passive traveler in a vehicle.

Passenger(s) or The Passenger(s) may also refer to:

Literature
 Passenger (Posmysz novel), by Zofia Posmysz, 1962, basis for the 1963 film and the 1968 opera
 "Passengers" (short story), by Robert Silverberg, 1968
 "The Passenger" (short story), by Vladimir Nabokov, 1927
 The Passenger (Boschwitz novel), by Ulrich Alexander Boschwitz, 1938
 The Passenger (McCarthy novel), by Cormac McCarthy, 2022
 The Passenger, a 2006 novel by Chris Petit
 "The Passenger", a 2012 horror story by Arinn Dembo

Film and television

Film
 The Passenger (1928 film), a French silent film by Jacques de Baroncelli
 The Passenger (1949 film), a French comedy by Jacques Daroy
 Passenger (1963 film), a Polish drama by Andrzej Munk
 The Passenger (1975 film), a drama by Michelangelo Antonioni
 The Passengers (1977 film), a French film by Serge Leroy
 The Passenger – Welcome to Germany, a 1988 drama by Thomas Brasch
 The Passengers (1999 film), a French film by Jean-Claude Guiguet
 Passengers (2003 film), an Indian documentary by Akanksha Damini Joshi
 The Passenger (2005 Éric Caravaca film), a French film
 The Passenger (2005 François Rotger film), a French-Canadian-Japanese film
 Passengers (2008 film), an American-Canadian thriller by Rodrigo Garcia
 Passenger (2009 film), an Indian Malayalam thriller by Ranjit Shankar
 Passengers (2016 film), an American science fiction film
 The Passenger (2021 film), a Spanish science fiction film

Television
 The Passenger (TV series), a 1979 Hong Kong drama series
 Passengers (TV series), a mid-1990s and early-2000s British Channel 4 series about youth culture
 Passenger (TV series), upcoming British ITV series
 "Chapter 10: The Passenger", an episode of The Mandalorian
 "The Passenger" (Star Trek: Deep Space Nine), an episode
 "The Passenger" (Westworld), an episode
 Tulip Olsen, or The Passenger, a character in the television series Infinity Train

Music
 Passenger Records, a New York-based record label
 The Passenger (opera), by Mieczysław Weinberg, 1968

Performers
 Passenger (singer) (born 1984), British folk-rock singer-songwriter Mike Rosenberg
 Passenger (British band), a folk-rock band previously fronted by Mike Rosenberg
 Passenger (Swedish band), a metal band
 Passenger, a pseudonym used by Tiësto for the 1997 single "Blackspin"; see Tiësto discography#Singles
 Passengers (side project), a side project formed by Brian Eno and U2 for the 1995 album Original Soundtracks 1
 Passengers (Italian band), a 1980s italo disco band
 The Passengers (band), a 1970s Belgian new wave band
 The Passengers, a 1980s Australian band led by Angie Pepper

Albums
 Passenger (Lisa Hannigan album) or the title song, 2011
 Passenger (Nico Touches the Walls album) or the title song, 2011
 Passenger (Mnemic album), 2007
 Passenger (Passenger album), 2003
 Passenger (Tara MacLean album) or the title song, 2000
 Passengers (Gary Burton album), 1977
 Passengers (soundtrack), from the 2008 film
 Passengers, by Mostly Autumn, 2003

Songs
 "Passenger" (Powderfinger song), 1999
 "The Passenger" (song), by Iggy Pop, 1977
 "Passengers" (Elton John song), 1984
 "Passenger", by Britney Spears from Britney Jean, 2013
 "Passenger", by Deftones from White Pony, 2000
 "Passenger", by DY, 2009
 "Passenger", by Hippo Campus from Bambi, 2018
 "The Passenger", by Kings of Convenience from Quiet Is the New Loud, 2001
 "Passenger", by Trapt from DNA, 2016
 "Passengers", by Starflyer 59 from Old, 2003

Other uses
 The Passenger (moth) or Dysgonia algira, a moth species
 The Passenger (Sapphire & Steel), a 2005 audio drama
 Phusion Passenger, a free web server and application server